Michael Dean Cain (born 4 December 1994) is an English footballer who plays as a midfielder for Blyth Spartans.

Career

Leicester City
Cain started his career playing for Luton Town in their youth academy system after having a successful junior career with AFC Dunstable. He was signed by Leicester City at the age of 16 for a potential "six figure sum". Where he joined Leicester City's development system, primarily playing for the under-18 and under-21 teams.

Mansfield Town (loan)
On 21 February 2014, Cain joined League Two side Mansfield Town on an initial one-month loan deal. Cain made his debut for Mansfield as a second-half substitute, replacing Chris Clements in the 67th minute of their 1–4 defeat to Bury.

Return to Leicester
On 26 August 2014, Cain made his Leicester City debut, along with fellow academy graduates, Ryan Watson and James Pearson, in the 0–1 defeat to Shrewsbury Town in the League Cup.

Walsall (loan)
On 20 October 2014, Cain joined League One side Walsall on a one-month loan. Cain made his debut in the 1–0 defeat away to Crawley Town on 21 October. On 17 November 2014, the loan was extended for a further month. Cain scored his first goal on 9 December 2014, in the 80th minute of the Football League Trophy fixture against Tranmere Rovers, to make it 2–2, sending the game to penalties, Walsall eventually winning 5–4. After making twelve appearances in all competitions for the Saddlers, Cain's loan spell was extended by a month on 22 December 2014. On 10 January 2015, Cain scored the first league goal of his professional career, in the 1–4 defeat to Scunthorpe United. He scored his second league goal the following weekend in a 2–0 win over Colchester on 17 January 2015. Cain's loan spell was extended until the end of the season on 20 January 2015. Cain was released from Leicester City in 2017.

Whitehawk
Cain signed for Whitehawk on 15 September 2017, making his debut the following day in the FA Cup 2nd Qualifying Round against Oxford City. In January 2018 Cain joined Hemel Hempstead Town.

After a spell playing in Thailand for Bankhai United, Cain returned to England featuring for Blyth Spartans in pre-season but later signing for Bishop Auckland. After one appearance, he returned to Blyth Spartans, signing a three-month deal.

Career statistics

References

External links

1994 births
Living people
English footballers
Footballers from Luton
Association football midfielders
Luton Town F.C. players
Leicester City F.C. players
Mansfield Town F.C. players
Walsall F.C. players
English Football League players
Blackpool F.C. players
Whitehawk F.C. players
Hemel Hempstead Town F.C. players
Michael Cain
English expatriate footballers
English expatriate sportspeople in Thailand
Expatriate footballers in Thailand
Bishop Auckland F.C. players
Blyth Spartans A.F.C. players